The Javan thick-thumbed bat (Glischropus javanus) is a species of vesper bat. It can be found in Indonesia.

References

Glischropus
Mammals described in 1939
Bats of Indonesia
Endemic fauna of Indonesia
Fauna of Java
Taxa named by Frederick Nutter Chasen
Taxonomy articles created by Polbot